Afrocostosa is a genus of moths belonging to the subfamily Tortricinae of the family Tortricidae, with a single species.

Species
Afrocostosa flaviapicella Aarvik, 2004

See also
List of Tortricidae genera

References

External links
tortricidae.com

Tortricidae genera
Monotypic moth genera
Moths of Africa